Crispin of Pavia was Bishop of Pavia.

References

Italian Roman Catholic saints
5th-century Italian bishops
Bishops of Pavia